Duane Edward Franklin Rupp (born March 29, 1938) is a Canadian retired ice hockey defenceman. He played in the National Hockey League from 1963 to 1973 and then in the World Hockey Association from 1974 to 1976.

Playing career
Rupp started his National Hockey League career with the New York Rangers. He would also play with the Toronto Maple Leafs, Minnesota North Stars, and the Pittsburgh Penguins. His NHL career would last from 1963 to 1973.

After playing the 1973–74 season with the Hershey Bears of the American Hockey League (AHL), Rupp played for two seasons with the Vancouver Blazers and Calgary Cowboys in the World Hockey Association before concluding his career in 1977 with the Rochester Americans of the AHL.

Post-playing career
After his retirement as a player, Rupp owned a sporting goods shop in Pittsburgh.

Career statistics

Regular season and playoffs

Awards and achievements
 Memorial Cup Championship (1957)
 AHL Second All-Star Team (1966, 1967, 1974)
 Played in NHL All-Star Game (1968)
 First defensemen to score a hat trick in Pittsburgh Penguin team history.
 Calder Cup (AHL) Championship (1974)
 Honoured Member of the Manitoba Hockey Hall of Fame

References

External links
 
 Duane Rupp's biography at Manitoba Hockey Hall of Fame

1938 births
Living people
Baltimore Clippers players
Calgary Cowboys players
Canadian ice hockey defencemen
Flin Flon Bombers players
Hershey Bears players
Ice hockey people from Saskatchewan
Kitchener Beavers (EPHL) players
Melville Millionaires players
Minnesota North Stars players
New York Rangers players
Pittsburgh Penguins players
Rochester Americans players
Springfield Indians players
Toronto Maple Leafs players
Vancouver Blazers players
Vancouver Canucks (WHL) players